Maryse Wolinski (3 May 1943 – 9 December 2021) was a French journalist, novelist and writer. She was the widow of cartoonist Georges Wolinski who died on 7 January 2015 during the Charlie Hebdo shooting in Paris.

Biography
Born in Algiers in May 1943, she spent her childhood in Paris and South East France, and at age 20 studied journalism. Her debut job was as a society writer in Sud-Ouest and later on Le Journal du Dimanche where she met her future husband cartoonist Georges Wolinski. They had three children. She also worked as a freelancer in a number of publications like F Magazine, Elle, Généraliste (a specialized medical magazine), and wrote frequently in Monde-Dimanche, a supplement to the daily newspaper Le Monde.

Wolinski wrote Une Histoire des femmes and her book La Divine Sieste de papa was adapted for television by director Alain Nahum. She also wrote songs sung by Carlos, Bernadette Lafont and Sarah Mesguish, broadcast during a Christmas programme on France 3 in 1986. She later on included them in a special publication that won best award for youth readers. She subsequently published other books destined to younger audiences and continued writing song lyrics that were sung by Catherine Bériane and Canadian Diane Tell.

She wrote a number of novels, like Au Diable Vauvert, Le Maître d’amour and La femme qui aimait les hommes, a best seller. She also published pocketbook novels Graines de Femmes, La Tragédie du Bonheur and La Chambre d’amour and a number of scenarios for television series most notably on TF1 called Protection rapprochée. Her 2016 book Chérie, je vais à Charlie dealt with the terrorist attack that killed her husband Georges.

Wolinski died of cancer in Paris on 9 December 2021, at the age of 78.

Novels

 Au Diable vauvert, Flammarion, 1988
 Le Maître d'amour, Flammarion, 1992 
 Graines de femme, Albin Michel, 1996
 La Femme qui aimait les hommes, Albin Michel, 1998
 La Tragédie du bonheur, Albin Michel, 1998
 La Chambre d'amour, Albin Michel, 1998
 La Mère qui voulait être femme, Seuil, 2008
 La Sibylline, Seuil, 2010
 La Passion d'Edith S., Seuil, 2014
 Chérie, je vais à Charlie, Seuil, 2016

Other books

 L'Adoption, une autre naissance, Bernard Barrault, 1992
 Lettre ouverte aux hommes qui n'ont toujours rien compris aux femmes, Albin Michel, 1993
 Si tu veux maigrir, mange !, Albin Michel , 2000
 Nous serons toujours jeunes et beaux, Albin Michel , 2001
 Chambre à part, Albin Michel, 2002
 L'Ivresse de vivre : le défi de la longévité, Albin Michel , 2004
 Georges, si tu savais…, Seuil, 2011
 Chérie, je vais à Charlie, Seuil, 2016 (trans. Darling, I'm Going to Charlie: A Memoir, Atria, 2017)
 Le Goût de la belle vie , Seuil, 2017

References

External links
 Official website
 

1943 births
2021 deaths
Pieds-Noirs
Deaths from lung cancer in France
French women journalists
French women novelists
Writers from Algiers
20th-century French novelists
21st-century French novelists
20th-century French women writers
21st-century French women writers
20th-century French journalists
21st-century French journalists